Gilbert John Krueger (May 28, 1929 – October 30, 2016) was an American football coach.  He served as the head football coach at Macalester College from 1966 to 1968, the University of Wisconsin–Platteville from 1969 to 1973, Northern Michigan University from 1974 to 1977, New Mexico State University from 1978 to 1982, and the University of Wisconsin–Superior from 1984 to 1987, compiling a career college football record of 104–114–4.  At Northern Michigan, his team won the NCAA Division II Football Championship in 1975. He died in 2016, aged 87.

Head coaching record

College

References

1929 births
2016 deaths
American men's basketball players
Macalester Scots football coaches
Marquette Golden Avalanche football players
Marquette Golden Eagles men's basketball players
North Central Cardinals football coaches
Northern Michigan Wildcats football coaches
New Mexico State Aggies football coaches
Wisconsin–Platteville Pioneers football coaches
Wisconsin–Superior Yellowjackets athletic directors
Wisconsin–Superior Yellowjackets football coaches
United States Football League coaches
High school football coaches in Wisconsin
Sportspeople from Milwaukee
Players of American football from Milwaukee
Basketball players from Milwaukee